August Berberich (18 March 1912 – 12 December 1982) was a German politician of the Christian Democratic Union (CDU) and former member of the German Bundestag.

Life 
Berberich was a member of the CDU. He was a member of the county council in the Buchen district of North Baden. He was a member of the state parliament of Württemberg-Baden from 1950 to 1952, and from 1952 to 1956 he was also a member of the constituent state assembly or the first state parliament of Baden-Württemberg.

Berberich was a member of the German Bundestag from 1957 to 1972. He represented the constituency of Tauberbischofsheim in parliament.

Literature

References

1912 births
1982 deaths
Members of the Bundestag for Baden-Württemberg
Members of the Bundestag 1969–1972
Members of the Bundestag 1965–1969
Members of the Bundestag 1961–1965
Members of the Bundestag 1957–1961
Members of the Bundestag for the Christian Democratic Union of Germany
Members of the Landtag of Baden-Württemberg
Commanders Crosses of the Order of Merit of the Federal Republic of Germany
Recipients of the Order of Merit of Baden-Württemberg